N. concinna may refer to:

 Nacella concinna, a sea snail
 Narosa concinna, a cup moth
 Neoleptoneta concinna, a haplogyne spider
 Nipponacmea concinna, a sea snail
 Nola concinna, a tuft moth
 Notoacmea concinna, a true limpet
 Nyssodectes concinna, a longhorn beetle